Barnsley is a market town in South Yorkshire, England. It is the main settlement of the Metropolitan Borough of Barnsley and the fourth largest settlement in South Yorkshire. The town's population was 96,888 in 2021, while the wider borough had a population of 244,600 in the 2021 census.

Historically in the West Riding of Yorkshire, it is located between the cities of Sheffield, Manchester, Doncaster, Wakefield and Leeds; the larger towns of Rotherham and Huddersfield are nearby. Barnsley's former industries include linen, coal mining, glass making and textiles. Barnsley's culture is rooted in its industrial heritage and it has a tradition of brass bands, originally created as social clubs by its mining communities.

History

The first reference to Barnsley occurs in 1086 in the Domesday Book, in which it is called Berneslai and has a population of around 200.

The town was in the parish of Silkstone and developed little until in the 1150s when it was given to the Pontefract Priory. The monks built a town where three roads met: the Sheffield to Wakefield, Rotherham to Huddersfield and Cheshire to Doncaster routes. The Domesday village became known as Old Barnsley, and a town grew up on the new site.

The monks erected a chapel of ease dedicated to Saint Mary, which survived until 1820 , and established a market. In 1249, a Royal charter was granted to Barnsley permitting it to hold a weekly market on Wednesdays and annual four-day fair at Michaelmas. By the 1290s, three annual fairs were held. The town was the centre of the Staincross wapentake, but in the mid-16th century had only 600 inhabitants.

From the 17th century, Barnsley developed into a stop-off point on the route between Leeds, Wakefield, Sheffield and London. The traffic generated as a result of its location fuelled trade, with hostelries and related services prospering. A principal centre for linen-weaving during the 18th and 19th century, Barnsley grew into an important manufacturing town.

The first passenger station to serve Barnsley was opened by the North Midland Railway in 1840. On 1 January 1850 the Manchester and Leeds Railway opened Barnsley Exchange station, close to the town centre. On 1 May 1870 the Midland Railway opened Regent Street station, a temporary structure. A new station was opened by the MR on the Regent Street site on 23 August 1873. As it incorporated the old court house in its construction Regent Street station was renamed Barnsley Court House station.

Barnsley became a municipal borough in 1869, and a county borough in 1913. The town's boundaries were extended to absorb Ardsley and Monk Bretton in 1921 and Carlton in 1938.

Barnsley was the site of a human crush that resulted in the deaths of 16 children in 1908, at a public hall now known as The Civic, when children were rushing to watch a film in the building.

Barnsley has a long tradition of glass-making, however Barnsley is most famous for its coal mines. In 1960, there were 70 collieries within a  radius of Barnsley town centre, but the last of these closed in 1994. The National Union of Mineworkers still has its HQ in Barnsley.

George Orwell mentioned the town in The Road to Wigan Pier. He arrived in the town on 11 March 1936 and spent a number of days in the town living in the houses of the working class miners while researching for the book. He wrote very critically of the council's expenditure on the construction of Barnsley Town Hall and claimed that the money should have been spent on improving the housing and living conditions of the local miners.

Governance

The Town Hall itself is visible behind some gardens; the building is made of white stone and has an impressive clock tower. Opened on 14 December 1933, Barnsley Town Hall is the seat of local government in the Metropolitan Borough of Barnsley.
The County Borough of Barnsley was created in 1913, administered independently of the West Riding of Yorkshire. In 1974, following the Local Government Act 1972, the county borough was abolished and Barnsley became part of the Metropolitan Borough of Barnsley in the new county of South Yorkshire, along with nine urban districts and parts of two rural districts of the surrounding area, including many towns and villages including Penistone and Cudworth.

Elections to Barnsley Metropolitan Borough Council have seen the Labour Party retain control of the council at every election. Following the latest election in 2012 the council has 53 Labour, 5 Barnsley Independent Group and 5 Conservative councillors. The borough council elects the mayor every year. On the day of the election, a parade takes place in front of the town hall in honour of the new mayor.

Barnsley is split into four constituencies, Barnsley Central, whose MP is Dan Jarvis of the Labour Party, Barnsley East, whose MP is Stephanie Peacock of the Labour Party, Penistone and Stocksbridge, whose MP is Miriam Cates of the Conservative Party, and Wentworth and Dearne, whose MP is John Healey of the Labour Party.

Geography
Barnsley is located in the valley of the River Dearne at the eastern foothills of the Pennines, near the uplands of the Peak District to the west. Geologically, the town is located within the area of the South Yorkshire Coalfield, consisting of the middle coal measures and sandstones laid down in the Carboniferous period.

Divisions and suburbs
Ardsley, Athersley, Barugh Green, Birdwell, Darton, Carlton, Cawthorne, Cudworth, Cundy Cross, Darfield, Dodworth, Elsecar, Gawber, Higham, Honeywell, Hoyland, Kendray, Kexbrough, Kingstone, Lundwood, Mapplewell, Monk Bretton, Tankersley, New Lodge, Oakwell, Old Town, Pogmoor, Royston, Shafton, Smithies, Silkstone, Staincross, Stairfoot, Thurnscoe, Wilthorpe, Woolley Colliery, Worsbrough (includes Worsbrough Bridge, Worsbrough Common, Worsbrough Dale, Worsbrough Village, and Ward Green), Wombwell.

Green belt

Barnsley is within a green belt region that extends into the borough and wider surrounding counties. It is in place to reduce urban sprawl, prevent the towns in the Barnsley/Dearne Valley conurbation from further convergence, protect the identity of outlying communities, encourage brownfield reuse, and preserve nearby countryside. This is achieved by restricting inappropriate development within the designated areas, and imposing stricter conditions on permitted building.

The green belt surrounds the Barnsley built-up area, separating towns and villages throughout the borough. Larger outlying communities such as Cudworth, Dodworth, Kendray, Monk Bretton, and Worsbrough are also exempt from the green belt area. However, nearby smaller villages, hamlets and rural areas such as Swaithe, Smithley, Low Laithes, and Upper Norcroft are 'washed over' by the designation. Much semi-rural land on the fringes is also included.

A subsidiary aim of the green belt is to encourage recreation and leisure interests, with rural landscape features, greenfield areas and facilities including the River Dearne valley, and tributaries Cawthorne Dyke and Tanyard Beck; Hugset and Dovecliffe Woods; Worsbrough Mill Park and reservoir; Dearne Valley Park; Trans Pennine Trail; Kendray recreation ground; Locke Park; Stainborough Cricket Club and Park; Wentworth Castle and gardens; Barnsley Colliery; Monk Bretton Priory; Laithes Lane playing fields; and Barnsley Golf Club. Beyond Penistone, the green belt also borders the Peak District National Park.

Demography
The 2011 census recorded that the population of the town was 91,297.

Ethnicity
According to the 2011 census Barnsley was:
94.7% White British
1.1% Asian
0.8% Black

Economy

The town was known for a thriving linen trade prior to the arrival of the coal industry. From the 1850s onwards, a large number of coal pits were opened, mostly in the villages surrounding the town, especially those to the east. Coal mining was the major industry of the town until the late 1950s, when a long-term decline set in. All the mines in the borough are now closed, the last to shut being Goldthorpe Colliery in 1994. Wire, linen and glass making were also major industries, but only glass making remains, with one company still operating. The coat of arms for the town has both a coal miner and a glass-blower supporting a shield and depicting local families and other industries, above a ribbon bearing the town's motto, Spectemur agendo ("Let us be judged by our acts").

Major companies in Barnsley include online retailer ASOS, the largest cake bakery in Europe, Premier Foods (formerly Lyons Bakery) who make the Mr Kipling Cake brand, Ardagh Glass (glass bottle makers), Symphony Kitchens, Premdor, several double glazing joinery manufacturers and a number of other large food manufacturers. Most of these businesses are based on industrial parks outside the town centre including many on reclaimed former coal mine sites. The town centre is now moving towards a service economy.

In July 2007, unemployment stood at 2.8% in Barnsley West & Penistone, 4.2% in Barnsley Central and 4.0% in Barnsley East & Mexborough, compared to the national average of 3.1%. Between 1997 and 2007, unemployment fell by 55.2%, 52.5% and 52.5% in the three areas respectively.

The western half of the borough stretches from the M1 to the edge of the Peak District and is rural in character. This western part includes the market town of Penistone and Wentworth Castle and its Grade I listed gardens, Cannon Hall Park and Museum, Cawthorne Jubilee Museum, Wortley Hall and gardens, and Wortley Top Forge (16th century Forge).

In 2002, Barnsley Council and partners launched a consultation, "Rethinking Barnsley". It led to a regeneration programme centred on the town centre which is still underway. Developments included the transport interchange, a cultural centre in the old Civic Hall, a Digital Media Centre (opened August 2007), and new offices and apartments throughout the town centre. At the same time new housing areas were developed. Business parks on the M1 at Junctions 37 and 36, and in the Dearne Valley, have expanded job opportunities. Unemployment is now below the national average. The economic development of Barnsley is led by the Barnsley Development Agency.

Significant industrial employers include the Ardagh Group and ASOS.com.

Town centre
A large part of Barnsley town centre was constructed during the 1960s. The area around Cheapside and May Day Green, the Metropolitan Centre, is home to the market and many national high street chains such as Marks & Spencer, Carphone Warehouse, Vodafone, Boots, and The Body Shop. It is in the process of renovation to make space for a new retail and leisure development. Alhambra Shopping Centre, which was opened in 1991, houses retailers such as Next, Poundstretcher, and Primark. Other prominent areas include Queen Street, home to Marks and Spencer, Market Street, Eldon Street and the Victorian Arcade, which houses the majority of the independent and designer retailers in Barnsley. The town also has a large concentration of pubs and bars in the central district. There is also a twin auditorium cinema called Parkway Cinema Barnsley occupying what once was the Odeon Cinema on Eldon Street.

Outside the town centre are large retail units, retail parks and supermarkets, which include Asda, Morrisons, Currys, and Halfords.

The development of a new shopping centre was started in the town centre in late 2015.

Development

Barnsley town centre is undergoing a period of change. Projects include:
The new Barnsley Interchange (now completed).
The Digital Media Centre (now completed).
Gateway Plaza at Town End (now completed).
Experience Barnsley – The creation of the Barnsley People's Museum and Archives Centre. This project was awarded almost £3m of funding from the Heritage Lottery Fund, which means two floors of Barnsley's distinctive town hall were transformed into state-of-the-art museum galleries, the first devoted to the borough's stories, past and present. (now completed)
Barnsley College A Block was completed and opened in September 2011.
Aimed for opening in 2021, a new area of town, covering the current Cheapside and semi-open market area is set to open by spring 2021. The facility is under construction, and is named 'The Glass Works'. The first stage of the development has opened and consists of the town's famous market. The new facility will create an urban, glass and steel fronted open-top shopping area, comparable to that of Trinity Walk in Wakefield. The development will include a 13-screen Cineworld cinema, bowling alley and high street brands never before seen in Barnsley. (now completed)

Landmarks

Barnsley Town Hall, recently turned into Experience Barnsley, a locally focused museum
Cannon Hall, a Museum, Park & Gardens in Cawthorne
Cannon Hall Farm, working farm and tourist attraction in Cawthorne
The Civic, an 1877 listed building now housing a theatre and art gallery
Houndhill, Worsbrough
Locke Park
Houghtons Folly
Monk Bretton Priory, Monk Bretton
Oakwell Stadium football ground, home of Barnsley Football Club
Wentworth Castle, country house and gardens in Stainborough
Barnsley Main, a Grade II listed building and the last remaining pithead in Barnsley, currently under development.

The first bottle bank for glass recycling collection in the United Kingdom was introduced by both Stanley Race CBE, then president of the Glass Manufacturers' Federation and major employer Redfearn's (now Rexam Glass) and Ron England in Barnsley. The bottle bank opened on 24 August 1977.

Transport

The main transport hub is Barnsley Interchange, a combined rail and bus station that was opened on Sunday 20 May 2007; it was the first project of the Remaking Barnsley scheme.

Buses
Stagecoach Yorkshire run most bus services within Barnsley, operating to and from Barnsley Interchange. Stagecoach acquired the company from Yorkshire Traction in 2005.

Railway
Passenger services are provided by Northern Trains. The standard hourly service pattern is as follows.

Northbound services:
One slower service to Leeds, along the Hallam Line via , taking around 50 minutes;

Southbound services: 

Evening and Sunday services operate less frequently.

Barnsley is also served by:
Dodworth railway station is west of the town centre, on the Penistone Line and has one platform;
Darton railway station is in north Barnsley, on the Hallam Line and has two platforms.

Air

Education

Barnsley College is situated on a number of sites throughout the town centre, chiefly Old Mill Lane campus, SciTech Centre, Honeywell Sports campus, CUBE Construction Centre and STEM Centre. The University of Huddersfield has recently opened a campus in the town on Church Street besides Barnsley Town Hall. This is known as the University Campus Barnsley.

All 14 secondary schools in Barnsley were demolished and replaced by academy education centres, named 'SuperSchools'. These new schools combined all the previous LEA run comprehensive schools in the area into newly PFI built academies under the Building Schools for the Future programme.

Notable people

 John Stones (born 1994), professional association football player for Manchester City football club and the England national football team
 Brian Glover (1934-1997) actor and wrestler who grew up in Barnsley.

Culture

Theatre

The Civic, in Barnsley town centre, is a multi-purpose performance venue in a grade II listed building. The building was originally the Barnsley Mechanics Institute and Public Hall, built by Henry Harvey in 1877. His brother Charles Harvey, gave the building to the people of the town a few years later, renaming it the Harvey Institute. The Harvey Institute was host to many types of entertainment, including variety shows and cinema. It was also home to the public library and shops; public meetings and celebrations were held in the hall; and education was provided. The School of Art occupied the Public Hall from 1878 to 1948, which was also used as first headquarters and billets for "Barnsley Pals" during World War I. In 1962 the building became Barnsley Civic Theatre, closing in 1998.
The Civic was re-opened in March 2009 after a major redevelopment, which included provision for a theatre and public art gallery. The Civic has hosted high-profile acts such as Al Murray and Russell Howard. The Civic houses a contemporary art gallery that hosts touring exhibition from the V&A and the Flow Gallery in London. The Civic also curates its own work for touring.

The Lamproom Theatre has four theatrical companies, and showcases theatre in the town.

The Academy Theatre is part of the Take 2 Centre where performances range from comedy to musicals. The Take 2 Centre houses The Take 2 Performing Arts Academy, The Stage Door Restaurant, and The Take 2 Music Centre.

Museums and galleries
Barnsley Council operates five museums, Elsecar Heritage Centre, Cannon Hall, the Cooper Gallery Worsbrough Mill and Experience Barnsley which opened in the Town Hall in 2015. Other museums in Barnsley include the volunteer-run Darfield Museum and the Cawthorne Victoria Jubilee Museum. Other heritage sites include Wortley Top Forge, Wortley Hall, Wentworth Castle, Monk Bretton Priory and Pot House Hamlet.

HIVE Gallery is a contemporary art gallery founded in 2007 by Creative Barnsley and Patrick Murphy. It is situated in Elsecar Heritage Centre and curates eight contemporary art exhibitions per year. The HIVE programme ranges from supporting emerging contemporary artists to exhibiting the work of nationally and internationally known artists. Previous shows have included famous artists such as Sir Peter Blake and Patrick Caulfield.

Music
Barnsley is home to a tradition of brass bands, which were originally created as social clubs for the mining communities. Grimethorpe Colliery Band, located in Grimethorpe,  to the east of Barnsley, is perhaps the best known brass band in Britain. It rose to fame in the film Brassed Off and is now the 'artist in residence' at the Royal College of Music, London. The band has performed in Hyde Park during the Last Night of the Proms. Other events include Picnic In The Park, being held annually to raise funds for Barnsley Hospice.

There is a live rock and hip hop music scene, which reached its height in the Britpop years, around 1997, due to its close proximity to Sheffield and Manchester. The 1980s saw the rise of Saxon (metal band), Danse Society (Goth) and Party Day (Indie-rock). Two of the Arctic Monkeys studied music at Barnsley College.

Barnsley is the home of several live music venues such as The Underground, The Garrison, The Old No 7 and The Old School House. Barnsley formerly hosted the Barnsley Origin Music festival (BOMfest), an outdoor summer music festival which catered for local and national artists. It now hosts Barnsley Live, an annual music festival featuring local acts that takes place in the town centre over a weekend in June.

Other arts

The "Bard of Barnsley" Ian McMillan writes a column in the Barnsley Chronicle. He was nominated for a chair of poetry at Oxford University, and appears on BBC Radio 4. Barnsley has long been known as Tarn by locals.

Ken Loach's 1969 film Kes was set and filmed in several villages in Barnsley, including Lundwood and Monk Bretton, using local actors such as Freddie Fletcher. His 1977 film The Price of Coal was set at a fictional Milton colliery in the Barnsley area, although the site of filming was Thorpe Hesley, near Rotherham.

Twin towns

Barnsley is twinned with:

Sport

Barnsley F.C. play in League One, the third tier of English football. Their home ground, Oakwell Stadium is situated in Oakwell, just outside the town centre. The club has had a mixed recent history. In the late 1990s they had a brief spell in the Premier League, but were relegated after one season. Subsequent seasons saw them relegated to the third tier of English football; they were promoted to the second tier in 2006, beating Swansea in the play off final. They were relegated in the 2013–14 season. After two seasons, Barnsley regained a place in the second tier, following a victory at Wembley in the 2016 Football League One play-off final, and the winners of the 2016 Football League Trophy Final. They were again relegated to the third tier at the end of the 2017–18 season.

Also in Barnsley, there is a women's football team called Barnsley WFC, who currently play in the North East Regional Women's Football League Premier Division.

Speedway racing was staged at a track near Barnsley at Lundwood. The track entered a team in the Northern Leagues of 1929 and 1930. Two-time British Under-21 Championship rider Josh Bates hails from the town. Greyhound racing was held at Dillington Park Stadium from 1934 -1990 and at the Dearne Athletic and Sports Stadium in Old Mill Lane, from 1934 to 1935. A third venue at the Queen's Ground was refused three times by the Corporation in 1936.

Rugby league is played in the town, at a number of clubs, past and present.
Dodworth ARLFC played in the second division of the BARLA run Pennine League, playing through the winter. They played at the Miners Welfare ground in Dodworth until deteriorating player participation forced the club to fold 5 games into the 2013/14 season.
The same fate befell Hoyland Vikings ARLFC, prompting talk of a merger. This however failed to materialise leaving only one club to represent the town.
The only representation now comes from the Dearne Valley Bulldogs in nearby Bolton on Dearne. Like Dodworth and Hoyland, they participate in the Pennine League.
Barnsley Broncos play in the RFL conference, which is a summer competition and runs from May to September. Also based at the Miners Welfare, Barnsley Broncos were set up to play in the less intense summer season.

Shaw Lane is the home to many sports in town, cricket, rugby union, squash, bowls, football, athletics and archery are all played to a high standard and host many of the towns teams including Barnsley CC and Barnsley RUFC. Peoples Sport in Barnsley is a project writing the history of participation in sport in Barnsley is in progress and is expected to be complete in 2015.

The town also has a high standard badminton league, with three separate tiers.

The town is home to Barnsley Harriers, a nationally recognised running club.

Ardsley Golf Club, Barnsley, (now defunct) first appeared in the 1930s. The club disappeared at the onset of the Second World War. Golf can still be played at Hillies in Wombwell and there is also a driving range at Staincross.

There are a number of cycling clubs in and around Barnsley, including Barnsley Road Club itself, the long-established Birdwell Wheelers and Team Cystic Fibrosis (a charity-focused team), together covering many different forms of cycle sport and leisure. There have also been various other initiatives set up to promote cycling in the town and district of Barnsley.

Freedom of the Town
The following People, Military Units and Organisations and Groups have received the Freedom of the Town of Barnsley.

Individuals
 Henry Horsfield (Town Clerk): 1912
  Charles Wray (Alderman and former Mayor 1896–1898 and 1903–1905): 1921
 Lieut-Colonel W. E. Raley (Alderman, 34 years service to Barnsley Corporation): 1921
 David Lloyd George (Prime Minister): 1921
 Harold Bird : 2000.
 Rita Britton: 2000.
 Rt Hon Lord Mason of Barnsley : 2007.
 Dr Joann Fletcher: 7 June 2016.
 Ian McMillan: 7 June 2016.
 David Moody Lord Lieutenant of South Yorkshire: 7 June 2016.
 Kate Rusby: 7 June 2016.
 Graham Ibbeson: 15 April 2022.
 Katherine Brunt: 15 April 2022.
 Katherine Kelly: 15 April 2022.

Military units
 The Light Dragoons
 The Yorkshire Regiment

Organisations and groups
 The ICU Staff at Barnsley Hospital: 15 April 2022.

See also

Holy Rood Church, Barnsley
Listed buildings in Barnsley (Central Ward)

References

External links

Barnsley Metropolitan Borough Council
Barnsley Development Agency
Barnsley & Rotherham Chamber Of Commerce
Barnsley and Surrounding Villages History

 
Towns in South Yorkshire
County towns in England
Unparished areas in South Yorkshire
Geography of the Metropolitan Borough of Barnsley